Hemlock Falls is a waterfall from the Hemlock Creek, in the heart of the Umpqua National Forest, just north of Hemlock Lake and its campground, in Douglas County, Oregon. Access to Hemlock Falls is from the Lake in the Woods campground. The waterfall is located in a privileged natural area where the river creates several waterfalls: Clover Falls, Yakso Falls, and Tributary Falls are within a mile distance.

Trail 
The trail to Hemlock Falls is approximately  out and back. The trailhead is located on the Lake in the Woods campground with frequent signs announcing the waterfall along the trail.

See also 
 List of waterfalls in Oregon

References

Waterfalls of Douglas County, Oregon